Method Mwanjali (born 25 April 1983 in Hwange) is a Zimbabwean football player who played as a defender for clubs in Zimbabwe, South Africa and Tanzania.

He also played for the Zimbabwean national team.

International career

International goals
Scores and results list Zimbabwe's goal tally first.

References

1983 births
Living people
Zimbabwean footballers
Zimbabwe international footballers
Association football defenders

Shabanie Mine F.C. players
CAPS United players
Mamelodi Sundowns F.C. players
Mpumalanga Black Aces F.C. players
Simba S.C. players
Zimbabwean expatriate footballers
Expatriate soccer players in South Africa
Zimbabwean expatriate sportspeople in South Africa
Expatriate footballers in Tanzania
Zimbabwean expatriate sportspeople in Tanzania
South African Premier Division players